The Mississippi Philosophical Association is a philosophical organization whose purpose is to advance the study of philosophy in Mississippi. The organization sponsors an annual conference. The association sponsors a student essay contest, where first and second prize winners present papers at the annual conference. Addresses of the Mississippi Philosophical Association are published by Rodopi Publishers.

External links
MPA website

Philosophical societies in the United States
Organizations based in Mississippi